Freeway 2 in Iran consists of two separate sections, one in northwestern Iran and one in northeastern Iran.

Western Section

The western section of Freeway 2 runs from the capital city Tehran to Tabriz in northwestern Iran. This freeway is an important transit road that connects Iran's industrial zones to Tabriz and Turkey. The section between Tehran and Karaj is one of the busiest sections in Iran with AADT of 217084. Karaj-Qazvin has an AADT of 79606.

{| class="wikitable"  style="text-align;center=" width:600px"
! text- style="center" colspan="3" |  From West to East 
|-  aline="background:#ffefd5;"
|colspan="7" |  Bazargan Customs  Turkey Gerede Gürbulak Otoyolu (turkish page) (planned)Gürbulak
|-
|text-align="center" colspan="3" bgcolor="#FFEFD5;" | Under Construction 
|-
| ||  Road 14-21-32West to Marand-Salmas-Jolfa-BazarganEast to Tabriz
|-
|  || Mayan RoadTowards Khvajeh Dizaj - Alvar-e Sofla - Mayan-e Olya
|- style="text-align:center;"
|  ||

|-
| colspan="7"  style="text-align:center; background:#F5 F5 DC;"|   Tabriz 
|-
|  style="text-align:center; background:F5 F5 DC;"|
|  style="text-align:center; background:F5 F5 DC;"|  Road 16-21South to Sardrud-Urmia-Miandoab Mellat Boulevard
|-
|  style="text-align:center; background:F5 F5 DC;"| 
|  style="text-align:center; background:F5 F5 DC;"|Vadi-e Rahmat Cemetery
|-
|  style="text-align:center; background:#ffefd5;"|
|  style="text-align:center; background:F5 F5 DC;"|  Sahandiyeh Boulevard

|-
|  style="text-align:center; background:F5 F5 DC;"| 
|  style="text-align:center; background:F5 F5 DC;"|  Niayesh BoulevardTabriz College of Technology
|-
|  style="text-align:center; background:F5 F5 DC;"| 
|  style="text-align:center; background:F5 F5 DC;"|  Mashruteh Boulevard

|-
|  style="text-align:center; background:F5 F5 DC;"| 
|  style="text-align:center; background:#F5 F5 DC;"| 

|-
|  style="text-align:center; background:F5 F5 DC;"| 
|  style="text-align:center; background:F5 F5 DC;"|  Maralan
|-
|  style="text-align:center; background:F5 F5 DC;"|
|  style="text-align:center; background:F5 F5 DC;"|  Mollasadra Boulevard
|-
|  style="text-align:center; background:#ffcbcb;" colspan="7"|  Service Station
|-
|  style="text-align:center; background:F5 F5 DC;"|
|  style="text-align:center; background:F5 F5 DC;"| 

 Bakeri Boulevard

|-
|  style="text-align:center; background:F5 F5 DC;"| 
|  style="text-align:center; background:F5 F5 DC;"|  Kasaei Expressway
|-
|  style="text-align:center; background:F5 F5 DC;"| 
|  style="text-align:center; background:F5 F5 DC;"|  Shadabad-e Olya
|-
| colspan="7"  style="text-align:center; background:#F5 F5 DC;"|   Tabriz 
|-
| ||  Road 16-32West to TabrizEast to Bostanabad
|-
| colspan="7"  style="text-align:center; background:#41 69 E1;" color: #FFFFFF|  Tabriz Toll Station
|-
|  ||  Road 16-32West to TabrizEast to Bostanabad-Ardabil-Mianeh
|-
| colspan="7"  style="text-align:center; background:#41 69 E1;" color: #FFFFFF|  Bostanabad Toll Station
|-
|  style="text-align:center; background:#ffefd5;"|
|  style="text-align:center; background:#ffefd5;"|  Maragheh-Hashtrud FreewayTowards Hashtrud
|-
| ||  Qarah AghajWest to MaraghehEast to Hashtrud
|-
|  style="text-align:center; background:#ffefd5;"|
|  style="text-align:center; background:#ffefd5;"|  Maragheh-Hashtrud FreewayTowards Maragheh
|-
| || West to Qareh Aghaj-MiandoabEast to Mianeh
|-
| colspan="7"  style="text-align:center; background:#50 C8 78;"|  East Azerbaijan Province  Zanjan Province 
|-
|  || North to Aqkand-ArdabilTowards |-
|  style="text-align:center; background:#ffcbcb;" colspan="7"| 30px30px Service Station
|-
| colspan="7"  style="text-align:center; background:#41 69 E1;"|  Zanjan-West Toll Station
|-
|  style="text-align:center; background:#ffcbcb;" colspan="7"| 30px30px Service Station
|-
|  || South to  Bijar-Sanandaj Zanjan
|-
|  || East to Soltaniyeh-Abhar Zanjan
|-
| colspan="7"  style="text-align:center; background:#41 69 E1;"| 30px Zanjan-East Toll Station
|-
| ||  Abbar
|-
| ||  Sorkheh Dizaj
|-
| || Towards  West to Zanjan-East to AbharTowards  South to Soltaniyeh-Qidar|-
|  style="text-align:center; background:#ffcbcb;" colspan="7"| 30px30px Shahr-e Aftab Service Station
|-
|  style="text-align:center; background:#ffcbcb;" colspan="7"| 30px30px Ghazal Service Station
|-
| ||  KhorramdarrehTowards |-
| ||  AbharTowards |-
| colspan="7"  style="text-align:center; background:#50 C8 78;"|  Zanjan Province  Qazvin Province 
|-
| || Towards |-
| ||  TakestanTowards Towards South to Hamadan
|-
| colspan="7"  style="text-align:center; background:#41 69 E1;"| 30px Qazvin-West Toll Station|-
|  || North To Kuhin-Rasht Qazvin
|-
|  || Freeway 1North to Rasht
|-
|  style="text-align:center; background:#ffcbcb;" colspan="7"| 30px30px Aftab-e Derakhshan Service Station|-
| ||  Qazvin Noruzian Boulevard
|-
| || Imam Khomeini International University Qazvin Nokhbegan Boulevard
|-
| ||  AlvandTowards West to QazvinEast to Mohammadiyeh-Abyek
|-
| colspan="7"  style="text-align:center; background:#41 69 E1;"| 30px Qazvin-East Toll Station|-
| ||  Qazvin
|-
|  style="text-align:center; background:#ffcbcb;" colspan="7"| 30px30px Service Station|-
| ||  Mohammadiyeh
|-
| || Caspian Industrial Park
|- style="text-align:center;"
|
|

|-
|  style="text-align:center; background:#ffcbcb;" colspan="7"| 30px30px Service Station|-
| ||  Ghadir Freeway
|-
| ||  TaleqanTowards 
|-
| ||  Abyek
|-
| colspan="7"  style="text-align:center; background:#50 C8 78;"|  Qazvin Province  Alborz Province 
|-
| ||  NazarabadTowards 
|-
| ||  Hashtgerd

|-
| ||  Hashtgerd Shahr-e Jadid-e Hashtgerd
|-
| ||  Kuhsar 
|-
| ||  Kamal Shahr Kordan
|-
|  style="text-align:center; background:#ffcbcb;" colspan="7"| 30px30px Service Station|-
| || West to Kamalshahr-Hashtgerd Karaj
|-
|  style="text-align:center; background:#ffefd5;"|
|  style="text-align:center; background:#ffefd5;"| 45px Karaj Northern bypass FreewayTowards Chalus
|-
| colspan="7"  style="text-align:center; background:#F5 F5 DC;"|   Karaj 
|-
| colspan="7"  style="text-align:center; background:#41 69 E1;" color: #FFFFFF| 30px Karaj Toll Station|-
|  style="text-align:center; background:F5 F5 DC;"| 
|  style="text-align:center; background:F5 F5 DC;"| GolshahrMehrshahr
|-
|  style="text-align:center; background:F5 F5 DC;"| 
|  style="text-align:center; background:F5 F5 DC;"| Golshahr

|-
|  style="text-align:center; background:F5 F5 DC;"| 
|  style="text-align:center; background:F5 F5 DC;"| Mehrvila
|-
|  style="text-align:center; background:F5 F5 DC;"| 
|  style="text-align:center; background:F5 F5 DC;"| Karaj-CenterMohammadshahrMahdasht

|-
|  style="text-align:center; background:F5 F5 DC;"| 
|  style="text-align:center; background:F5 F5 DC;"| Karaj-Center
|-
|  style="text-align:center; background:F5 F5 DC;"| 
|  style="text-align:center; background:F5 F5 DC;"| Karaj-CenterFardis

|-
|  style="text-align:center; background:F5 F5 DC;"| 
|  style="text-align:center; background:F5 F5 DC;"| North to Chalus18px Karaj Makhsus Expressway
|-
| colspan="7"  style="text-align:center; background:#F5 F5 DC;"|   Karaj 
|-
| ||  Garmdarreh
|-
| colspan="7"  style="text-align:center; background:#50 C8 78;"|  Alborz Province  Tehran Province 
|-
| colspan="7"  style="text-align:center; background:#F5 F5 DC;"|   Tehran 
|-
|  style="text-align:center; background:#ffefd5;"|
|  style="text-align:center; background:F5 F5 DC;"|  (Lashkari Expressway)30px Kharrazi Expressway
|-
|  style="text-align:center; background:F5 F5 DC;"| 
|  style="text-align:center; background:F5 F5 DC;"| Shahrak-e Daneshgah-e Sharif

|-
|  style="text-align:center; background:F5 F5 DC;"| 
|  style="text-align:center; background:F5 F5 DC;"|  Pajuhesh Boulevard
|-
|  style="text-align:center; background:F5 F5 DC;"| 
|  style="text-align:center; background:F5 F5 DC;"| AzadshahrPeykanshahr

|-
|  style="text-align:center; background:F5 F5 DC;"| 
|  style="text-align:center; background:F5 F5 DC;"| Chitgar ParkShahrak-e Golestan
|-
|  style="text-align:center; background:F5 F5 DC;"| 
|  style="text-align:center; background:F5 F5 DC;"|  Kuhak Boulevard

|-
|  style="text-align:center; background:F5 F5 DC;"| 
|  style="text-align:center; background:F5 F5 DC;"|  Azadegan Expressway
|-
| colspan="7"  style="text-align:center; background:#F5 F5 DC;"| Continues as: Sheikh Fazl-allah Nouri Expressway
|-
! text- style="text-align:center;" colspan="3"|  From East to West 
|}

Gallery

Eastern Section

The eastern section of Freeway 2''' starts from Mashhad and ends in Baghcheh. There is a project under construction to connect this freeway to Tehran.

Tehran Southern bypass Section (Ghadir Freeway)

References
 Iran Road Maintenance & Transportation Organization
 Road management center of Iran
 Ministry of Roads & Urban Development of Iran  

AH1
2
Transportation in East Azerbaijan Province
Transportation in Qazvin Province
Transport in Tabriz
Transport in Tehran
Transportation in Tehran Province
Transportation in Zanjan Province